Cip1-interacting zinc finger protein is a protein that in humans is encoded by the CIZ1 gene.

Function 
The protein encoded by this gene is a zinc finger DNA binding transcription factor that interacts with CIP1 (p21 / CDKN1A), part of a complex with cyclin E. The encoded protein may regulate the cellular localization of CIP1.

Clinical significance 
An altered circulating form of the Ciz1 protein is synthesized by lung cancer cells, even when they are at a very early stage. Hence detection of this protein variant in blood could be used as a biomarker for early detection of lung cancer.

Ciz1 mutant mice

Aged (18-mo-old) Ciz1-/- mice have increased neuronal DNA double-strand breaks that likely contributed to their loss of neurons and cognitive decline with age.  Embryonic fibroblasts from Ciz1-/- mice show abnormal sensitivity to γ-irradiation with persistent DNA breaks, aberrant cell cycle progression and increased apoptosis.

Interactions 
CIZ1 has been shown to interact with P21.

References

External links

Further reading